The Regent Theatre is the name of several theatres in various cities. including:

Australia
 Regent Theatre, Adelaide
 Regent Theatre in  Ballarat, Victoria, now home to Regent Cinemas
 Regent Theatre, Brisbane
 Regent Theatre, Melbourne
 Regent Theatre (Sydney)
 Regent Theatre, Wollongong

Canada
 Regent Theatre (Oshawa, Ontario)
 Regent Theatre (Picton, Ontario)

New Zealand
 Regent on Broadway, a large theatre in Palmerston North
  Regent Theatre, Dunedin, famous for its annual second-hand book sale

United Kingdom
 Regent Theatre, Ipswich
 Regent Theatre, Salford (destroyed by fire 1952)
 Regent Theatre, Stoke-on-Trent

United States
Regent Theatre (Arlington, Massachusetts)